The National Engineering & Scientific Commission (NESCOM) is a Pakistani missile manufacturer and civilian research organization of Pakistan, under the administrative control of the Strategic Plans Division of Pakistan's National Command Authority and is headquartered in Islamabad, Pakistan.

In 2007, it was reported that NESCOM had exported military equipment worth approximately $40 million annually to various countries in the Middle East, South East Asia, and Africa. According to then-Chairman Samar Mubarakmand, NESCOM had developed various communication systems and electronic counter-measures systems for the Pakistan Air Force and Pakistan Navy.

History

National Engineering & Scientific Commission (NESCOM) was formed in 2000 by amalgamating the National Development Complex, Air Weapons Complex, Maritime Technologies Complex and the Project Management Organization.

In the early 2000s, NESCOM rapidly achieved several firsts. Among them, was the development of the Shaheen family of missiles, the Babur ground-launched cruise missile and the Ra'ad air-launched cruise missile.

Organization

In 2004, it was revealed by then-Director Samar Mubarakmand that NESCOM was organized into divisions, with each division being headed by a top scientist of international repute having around 600-1000 engineers and technicians under his supervision.

The following organizations are grouped together under NESCOM:
 National Development Complex - responsible for the development of Pakistan's ground-based, solid-fueled ballistic missiles and cruise missile systems
 PMO - responsible for the development of ground-launched cruise missiles and other surface-to-air and surface-to-surface ammunition
 Air Weapons Complex - responsible for the development of air-launched cruise missiles and other air-to-air and air-to-surface ammunition
 Maritime Technologies Complex - responsible for the development of maritime defense systems including ship design, radars, sonar equipment, weapon launch systems.

Research Divisions

 Aerospace
 Missiles & Rockets
 Electronics & Electro-optics
 C4ISR & Navigation
 Ammunition
 Land systems
 Naval systems
 Materials & Chemical systems
 Cyber securities

Notable Products & Projects

Ballistic Missile Systems
 Nasr - solid-fueled hypersonic Tactical ballistic missile system with a range of 70-90 kilometres (km).
 Abdali - solid-fueled short-range ballistic missile (SRBM) system with a range of 200 km.
 Ghaznavi - short-range ballistic missile system with a range of 320 km.
 Shaheen-I - solid-fueled ballistic missile system with a reported range of 900 km. The Shaheen was Pakistan's first solid-fueled missile. The missile project began in 1995 and the development and design was carried out by NESCOM's predecessor, the National Development Complex (NDC).
 Shaheen-IA - an upgraded version of the Shaheen-I with a range of 1000 km. The upgrade was supposedly carried out by NESCOM in the early 2000s and supposedly included a terminal guidance system, improved radar-avoidance capability and stealth features.
 Ababeel - solid-fueled multiple independently targetable reentry vehicle (MIRV)-capable ballistic missile system with a reported range of 2,200 km.
 Shaheen-II - solid-fueled medium-range ballistic missile (MRBM) system with a reported range of 2,500 km.
 Shaheen-III - solid-fueled ballistic missile system with a reported range of 2,750 km.

Land-Based Guided Missile Systems
 Babur-I - ground-launched anti ship and land attack cruise missile with a reported range of 700 km to 900 km
 Babur-II - an upgraded ground-launched anti ship and land attack cruise missile of Babur-I with a reported range of 750 km

Ship-Based Guided Missile Systems
 Harbah - ship-launched anti ship and land attack cruise missile derived from Babur-II with an estimated range of 750 km

Submarine-Based Guided Missile Systems
 Babur-III - submarine-launched anti ship and land attack cruise missile derived from Babur-II with a reported range of 450 km

Air-to-Surface Guided Missile Systems
 Barq - air-launched laser-guided missile carried on the Burraq UCAV, reported range of 8 to 12 km
 Ra'ad - air-launched cruise missile with an original range of 350 km
 Ra'ad-II - an upgraded air-launched cruise missile of Ra'ad reported range of 600 km

Air-to-Air Missiles
 Air-to-air missile research – It was reported in November 2001 that the Aerospace Division of NDC was doing "preliminary studies" for developing a new medium range air-to-air missile. According to the report no full scale hardware had yet been built but investigations by NDC engineers into various design approaches were ongoing. The report stated that suggested that the missile may use active radar homing.

Guided Bombs
 H-2 SOW – precision-guided munition
 H-4 SOW – precision-guided munition

Unguided Bombs
 250 kg – Pre-fragmented bomb
 250 kg Mk.82 – General-purpose bomb
 500 kg Mk.83 – General-purpose bomb
 1000 kg Mk.84 – General-purpose bomb
 HAFR-1, HAFR-2 and RPB-1 – Anti-runway Bombs (possibly variants of the Matra Durandal)
 6 kg, 11 kg Practice bombs

Depleted Uranium Ammunition
 105 mm anti-tank round – a DU APFSDS anti-tank round developed to be fired by Type 59 tanks (upgraded with 105 mm guns) in service with the Pakistan Army. Reported to have a muzzle velocity of 1,450 m/s and be capable of penetrating 450 mm of rolled homogeneous armour (RHA) at an unspecified range.
 Naiza (125 mm anti-tank round) – a DU APFSDS anti-tank round developed to be fired by T-80UD tanks in service with the Pakistan Army. A model of the round was put on display at the IDEX 2001 exhibition in the United Arab Emirates and it was stated to have a DU long rod penetrator, performance 25% greater than NDC's 105 mm DU round and a saddle-type sabot with re-arranged forward bore-rider for more accurate alignment with the T-80UD's autoloader. Displayed at IDEAS 2002 alongside DU rounds produced by other Pakistani organisations. Reportedly named "Naiza", made compatible with the T-80UD tank and stated to be capable of penetrating 550 mm of RHA.

Unmanned Aerial Vehicles
 Anka - unmanned combat aerial vehicle (UCAV) - (Jointly produce with Turkish aerospace company Turkish Aerospace Industries)
 Burraq - unmanned combat aerial vehicle (UCAV)

Naval Systems
 Starfish Naval Mine – a naval mine that targets submarines and ships, details on the mine were first released in 2001. Can be deployed by aircraft, ships and submarines. Makes use of solid state electronics. The mine's attack modes are controlled by a microprocessor which uses magnetic, acoustic and pressure sensors to analyse a potential target's signature. Sensors are mounted flush to both ends of the mine's cylindrical (barrel) shape. It is unknown if the mine has a self-destruct mechanism. Weight: 767 kg, warhead: 500 kg HE (PBX charge), storage life: 20 years.
 MSL Advanced Towed Array Sonar (ATAS) – a towed array sonar developed by Maritime Systems Ltd. (MSL) and MTC to replace old systems in service with the Pakistan Navy and for export. Project started during the 1990s, Commodore Sarfraz appointed as program chief. System was designed to cope with Arabian Sea environment and is stated to be superior to foreign systems being offered for export. Expected to be installed on Agosta 70 and Agosta 90B class submarines currently in service with the Pakistan Navy, also being integrated with the Agosta 90B's SUBTICS combat management system, as well as future vessels to be acquired by the Pakistan Navy such as new submarines and corvettes.
 Naval Training Simulator – programmable training system. Simulates maritime sensors and weapon systems of aircraft, warships and submarines under any weather or sea conditions. Installed on the Jalalat II class fast attack craft of the Pakistan Navy.
 Shore-based/ship-based electronic warfare system
 Ship-borne display consoles

References

Military research of Pakistan
Research institutes in Pakistan
Pakistani engineering organisations
Pakistan federal departments and agencies
2000 establishments in Pakistan
Guided missile manufacturers
Unmanned aerial vehicle manufacturers of Pakistan
Defence companies of Pakistan